Gavin Lynch (born 7 September 1985, Liverpool) is an English footballer. He played in The Football League for Chester City and retired after playing for Warrington Town in 2015. Gavin is currently 4th in his works Fantasy Football League

Playing career
Lynch was an apprentice with Everton before being released in March 2004. He moved to Chester City, where he was awarded his first-team debut as a late substitute for Michael Branch against Halifax Town in the FA Cup second round on 4 December 2004. The following month saw Lynch's solitary Football League outing arrive when he replaced fellow youngster Michael Walsh in the closing stages of a 3–0 loss at Swansea City.

At the end of the season, Lynch was one of a high number of players released by Chester and he spent the next two years with Marine. In the summer of 2007, Lynch moved to Prescot Cables, marking his debut with a tremendous display against North Ferriby United. In February 2008 he moved to Warrington Town.

External links

References

1985 births
Living people
Sportspeople from Chester
English footballers
Association football forwards
English Football League players
Everton F.C. players
Chester City F.C. players
Marine F.C. players
Prescot Cables F.C. players
Warrington Town F.C. players